The National Confederation of Trade Unions of Greenland (Greenlandic: Sulinermik Inuussutissarsiuteqartut Kattuffiat or simply SIK) is  a trade union centre in Greenland. It was formed in 1956 as 'GAS, Grønlands Arbejder Sammenslutning" until 1978 and has a membership more than 10,000, approximately 40 % of the Greenlandic workforce.

SIK is affiliated with the Council of Nordic Trade Unions.

Presidents
1956: Lars Svendsen
1961: Kaj Johnsen
1963: Ôdâq Olsen
1972: Ulf Olsen
1973: Ôdâq Olsen
1978: Abraham Mikaelsen
1978: Ôdâq Olsen
1980: Jens Lyberth
1987: Finn Heilmann (May-October)
1987: Jonas Fleischer (March)
1987: Jens Johansen (March)
1988: Ole Magnussen
1989: Kristian "Pablo" Poulsen
1990: Jess G. Berthelsen

External links
SIK's Official Website (in Greenlandic/Danish)
SIK's Official Website (in English)

References

Trade unions in Greenland
Greenland
Trade unions established in 1956
National federations of trade unions
1956 establishments in Greenland